If You're Feeling Sinister is the second album by the Scottish indie pop band Belle and Sebastian. It was released in 1996 on Jeepster Records in the United Kingdom and in 1997 by Matador Records in the United States. It is often ranked among the best albums of the 1990s, including being ranked #14 in Pitchfork's list of Top 100 Albums of the 1990s.

Band leader Stuart Murdoch said If You're Feeling Sinister is probably his best collection of songs. In 2005, Belle and Sebastian released a live version, If You're Feeling Sinister: Live at the Barbican.

Recording and production
After the release of their debut album Tigermilk, Belle and Sebastian were approached by a number of record labels. They signed with the independent label Jeepster Records in the interests of staying independent creatively. Jeepster was willing to accept some of the group's other demands, such as releasing no singles, not doing press or promotional events, and not appearing in promotional materials.

At this point, Stuart Murdoch and drummer Richard Colburn had taken up residence in a flat above Hyndland Parish Church in Glasgow, where Stuart was a caretaker, with the band using the church's hall as their rehearsal space. They began rehearsing new material, written by Murdoch, after signing with Jeepster. The album took five days to record and three to mix, slightly longer than Tigermilk. It was recorded in the same studio as Tigermilk and engineer Tony Doogan worked with the band's previous engineer to maintain a similar recording style. Band member Sarah Martin, who had recently joined the band at this point, likened Tigermilk and If You're Feeling Sinister to The Beatles' albums Rubber Soul and Revolver in the sense that the two albums were recorded quickly after one another.

The cover photo was taken by Murdoch of his friend, Ciara MacLaverty; like Murdoch, MacLaverty suffered from chronic fatigue syndrome.  It features a copy of The Trial by Franz Kafka.

Critical reception

If You're Feeling Sinister received critical acclaim. Pitchfork placed it at number 14 in its top 100 albums of the 1990s. Later, the readers of Pitchfork voted the album the 31st greatest album released between 1996 and 2011. Rolling Stone featured the album at number 75 on its list of "100 Best Albums of the Nineties," while Spin included the record at number 59 on its "125 Best Albums of the Past 25 Years" list. If You're Feeling Sinister also appears as an entry in the book 1001 Albums You Must Hear Before You Die as chosen by music critics. The album was placed at number 8 on The Village Voices Pazz & Jop annual critics' poll for 1997. The album was ranked No. 481 of the Top 500 Albums of All Time by Rolling Stone in 2020.

In 2007, as part of the 33⅓ series, Scott Plagenhoef wrote a book about the album.

In February 2013, Pitchfork.tv released an hour-long documentary about the album directed by RJ Bentler. For the documentary, every band member who played on the album was interviewed. It featured archive photographs and videos from the band's early days.

Reflecting on it 20 years on, Stereogums Tom Breihan claimed that Sinister could be "too influential", despite it taking "a long time for [the band's] influence to spread." In time, their impact would "fully sink into the bloodstream of the indie rock world." He saw the band's timidity taken, "Americanized", and introduced to a new audience in US college kids by American band Death Cab for Cutie. He also credited them with impacting the development of "sensitive and proudly bookish" indie stars like the Decemberists and Sufjan Stevens. Other groups that critics have noted Sinister inspiring include Alvvays, Hovvdy, Kings of Convenience, and the Shins.

Track listing

Personnel
Stuart Murdoch – lead vocals, guitar, piano
Stuart David – bass
Isobel Campbell – cello, vocals, percussion, recorder
Chris Geddes – keyboards, piano
Richard Colburn – drums
Stevie Jackson – guitar, vocals, harmonica
Sarah Martin – violin, recorder, percussion
Mick Cooke – trumpet (1, 6, 10)

Charts

References

1996 albums
Albums produced by Tony Doogan
Belle and Sebastian albums
Jeepster Records albums
Chamber pop albums